A zentai suit is a skin-tight garment that covers the entire body. The word is a portmanteau of zenshin taitsu. Zentai is most commonly made using nylon/spandex blends.

Use
The costumes are seen at major sporting events in North America and the United Kingdom. They created internationally recognized personalities out of The Green Men, two fans of the Vancouver Canucks NHL team. Various professional street dance/hip hop dance groups use the outfits, such as The Body Poets in the United States, and Remix Monkeys in the United Kingdom.

Full-body suits are used for video special effects: the original colors offered enables the person wearing the chroma key suit to be lifted easily from a video image. Other applications have included music videos (Black Eyed Peas' song "Boom Boom Pow", including the live performance at the Super Bowl), breast cancer awareness, fashion modeling on an episode of America's Next Top Model, social anxiety workshops, television (Charlie Kelly as Green Man), a participant in public art project "One & Other", and social experiments.

Legal limitations
Since zentai cover one's face, a fine of up to €150 may be issued to those who wear them publicly in France. Furthermore, some sports leagues, such as Major League Baseball, ban the use of the costume hoods.

Brands
Companies have created brands of the suits including RootSuit or Superfan Suit in the United States, Bodysocks or Second Skins by Smiffy's and Morphsuits in the United Kingdom, and Jyhmiskin in Finland. Morphsuits has achieved relative commercial success internationally. Between January and late October 2010, the company shipped 10,000 to Canada alone. The Morphsuits brand has actively tried to disassociate themselves from the existing zentai community. Superfan Suits acknowledges in interviews that the outfits have existed previously. The term "morphsuit" has become a generic term in the process; one New Zealand-based newspaper refers to competing brand Jaskins as "one of the main online morphsuit brands." Jaskins company founder Josh Gaskin says their origins are unclear, pegging the first usage with It's Always Sunny in Philadelphia.

See also

 Bodystocking
 Black light theatre, which can use all-black zentai attire for its performances
 Catsuit
 Cosplay
 Dancewear
 Kigurumi
 Spandex fetishism
 Morphsuits

Notable users of Zentai
 Pink Guy, musical artist
 Jonathan Bree, musical artist
 The Great Morgani, performance artist
 Pandemonia, performance artist

References

Further reading 
 Will Doig, "Men Who Love Lycra", The Daily Beast, 3 March 2010.

External links

Costume design
Fetish clothing
Minimalist clothing
One-piece suits